Allocasuarina  humilis, commonly known as the dwarf sheoak or dwarf casuarina, is a woody shrub of the family Casuarinaceae endemic to the south-west of Western Australia.

Description
Unlike many sheoaks which grow into trees, Allocasuarina humilis only reaches 20 cm to 2 m (8–80 in) in height. A many branched shrub, its branchlets ascend from larger branches and reach 12 cm (5 in) in length. As with other sheoaks, its foliage consists of slender green branchlets informally referred to as "needles" but more correctly termed cladodes. The cladodes are segmented, and the true leaves are tiny teeth encircling each joint. It can be dioecius or monecious. The reddish-brown male flower spikes are between 6 and 18 mm long and the warty cones are cylindrical, about 12 to 22 mm in length and 10 to 17 mm in diameter.

Taxonomy
Originally described as Casuarina humilis by German naturalists Christoph Friedrich Otto and Albert Gottfried Dietrich in 1841 from a specimen cultivated in Berlin Botanical Gardens, the dwarf sheoak was transferred to the new genus Allocasuarina by botanist Lawrie Johnson in 1982. The species name is the Latin adjective hǔmǐlǐs "on - " or "close to the ground" (hǔmus). A 2003 molecular study of the family Casuarinaceae showed the dwarf sheoak and the horned sheoak (A. thuyoides) to be sister taxa, and form a clade with A. thuyoides, A. microstachya, karri oak (A. decussata)   and western sheoak (A. fraseriana),  all from Western Australia.

Distribution and habitat
Allocasuarina humilis is found across southwest Western Australia, from the Murchison River in the north, to the south coast, where it extends eastwards to Israelite Bay. It grows on sand, sand over laterite, gravel, or clay.

Cultivation
Allocasuarina humilis adapts readily to cultivation. Versatile, it tolerates a wide range of soils, including those with some alkalinity, and prefers a sunny aspect. Tolerant of some exposure to coastal conditions, it is also planted for erosion control and as a windbreak. Unlike many Australian native plants, it is relatively tolerant of phosphates to some degree in cultivation.

References

External links

humilis
Rosids of Western Australia
Fagales of Australia